Mariasela Álvarez Lebrón (born January 31, 1960 in Santo Domingo) is a Dominican architect, TV Host and beauty queen who was crowned Miss World 1982. She became the first Dominican woman to win an international beauty title. Álvarez achieved much popularity in her native country, due to her long career on television, which included a successful eight-year run with her award-winning show Esta Noche Mariasela. She is also an accomplished architect who has designed important buildings in the Dominican Republic.

Career
The native of Santo Domingo, the Dominican capital, was crowned the 32nd Miss World, on November 18, 1982 at the Royal Albert Hall, London.

At the end of her term as Miss World, she returned to her country and finished her studies of architecture at the Universidad Autonoma de Santo Domingo (UASD). Álvarez has designed many buildings in her home country, including one of Santo Domingo's landmarks, the Torre Cristal, where the telephone company Codetel has one of its commercial branches.

In 1991, she engaged in the television business and hosted her own weekly talk show Con los Ojos Abiertos (lit. "With Open Eyes"), which she co-hosted at the beginning with Milagros Germán Olalla, Miss Dominican Republic 1980.

In 1996 she opened her own television production company, Maralva, S. A., which produced four miniseries for eight years in Esta Noche Mariasela (Tonight Mariasela), a variety weekly show of two hours, winner of the  Casandra Award four times for the Best Special Television Show.

In 2004 Álvarez relocated to Madrid with her Spanish husband, well known hotelier Alberto del Pino, and since 2005 she has been producing the shows Esta Noche Mariasela (lit. "Mariasela Tonight") and Esta Tarde Mariasela (lit. "Mariasela This Afternoon") for Popular TV, an UHF channel property of COPE, the second largest radio broadcast station in Spain.

Family
Until late 2011, Álvarez was married to Sergio Alberto Fernández-del Pino Fernández for 27 years. They had four children: Andrés Alberto Fernández del Pino Álvarez, Chantal Fernández del Pino Álvarez, Rebeca Fernández del Pino Álvarez, Emmanuel Fernández del Pino Álvarez. She is the niece of Mariano Lebrón Saviñón.

Community work

Álvarez founded Hogar Mariololy in 1993, through the Ena Lebrón de Álvarez Foundation, created in honor of her mother. She also founded the Casa Rosada of Santo Domingo, a home run by the Congregation of Las Hijas de la Caridad, for orphans and HIV children.

References

External links
El Mundo (in Spanish)
Newspaper Hoy (in Spanish)

 

1960 births
Living people
People from Santo Domingo
Miss Dominican Republic
Dominican Republic beauty pageant winners
Miss World winners
Miss World 1982 delegates
Dominican Republic television producers
Dominican Republic architects
Dominican Republic emigrants to Spain
Dominican Republic people of Spanish descent
Women television producers
Women architects